The Order of Omega is an undergraduate Greek society recognizing "fraternity men and women who have attained a high standard of leadership in inter-fraternity activities." It functions as an adjunct to traditional fraternal organizations, rather than a social or professional group in se. It is not an academic honor society; a minimum Grade Point Average is only one of six criteria for admission, and Order of Omega is not a part of the Association of College Honor Societies.

History 
The Order of Omega was established in Fall 1959 at the University of Miami. It sought to differentiate itself from the long-standing Greek honors society of Phi Beta Kappa by emphasizing community service and inter-Greek communication over academic and nominal honors. At that time, the group adopted as its mark the Greek letter omega, in gold on an ivory field. The organization was unique to the University of Miami until, in 1967, a second charter was granted to begin a chapter at University of Southern Mississippi. The group remained exclusive to men until 1977.

In more recent years, the Order has emerged as a moot arena in which the Fraternity/Sorority community can air progressive changes to its member organizations as a whole; the 'dry' movement eschewing alcohol use among many groups drew a great deal of support from discussion in the early 1980s about how to improve the general reputation of the Fraternity/Sorority community. The stated purposes of the organization are:
  To recognize those fraternity men and women who have attained a high standard of leadership in interfraternity activities, to encourage them to continue along this line, and to inspire others to strive for similar conspicuous attainment;
 To bring together outstanding fraternity men and women to create an organization which will help to mold the sentiment of the institution on questions of local and intercollegiate fraternity affairs.
 To bring together members of the faculty, alumni, and student members of the institution's fraternities and sororities on a basis of mutual interest, understanding and helpfulness;
 To help create an atmosphere where ideas and issues can be discussed openly across Greek lines and to help work out solutions.

At present, the Order maintains over 575 chapters at colleges and universities in the United States and Canada.

Standards and operation 
The executive board of the individual Order of Omega chapter is empowered to make decisions concerning the merit of an applicant and initiate them into the Order based upon the following criteria: character, scholarship, offices held in Greek organizations, service to the Fraternity/Sorority community, and service to the university community as a whole. It requires sophomore, junior, or senior classification standing, full-time attendance as a student, and a GPA that is at or above the All-Greek GPA at the campus in question.  Order of Omega represents the top 5% within the Fraternity/Sorority community on each of its campuses.

Much of most chapters' typical operation consists of charitable fundraisers, and the selection of persons to receive scholarships endowed by alumni. Persons are only eligible to be initiated into the Order as regular members if they are undergraduates in accredited colleges and universities, but are considered members for life, and some continue to support their chapters financially.  Faculty, staff, alumni, and others may be elected as honoris causa members.

Order of Omega began offering an undergraduate scholarship program in 1985, and has since awarded over $1.5 million in undergraduate scholarships (annually awards about $65,000).  In addition, Order of Omega offers a Master's or Doctoral Fellowship award to postgraduate students in an accredited Master's or Doctoral program in Higher Education or Student Affairs personnel, or related fields.

References

External links 
 Official Order of Omega web site

Honor societies
Student organizations established in 1959
Fraternities and sororities in the United States
1959 establishments in Florida